Old Haverford Friends Meetinghouse is a historic Quaker meeting house at 235 East Eagle Road in Havertown, Delaware County, Pennsylvania, United States.  The burial ground attached to Old Haverford Friends Meetinghouse was laid out in 1684. In 1688, the log meetinghouse was built. Later, a stone meetinghouse was subsequently completed in 1700.  It is believed that the southern portion of the meetinghouse, with its rougher masonry, is the original stone building.     William Penn preached here soon after construction was complete and often attended worship.  The northern portion of the building was expanded in 1800.

Old Haverford Friends Meeting is an active faith community and center for worship.

References

Quaker meeting houses in Pennsylvania
Churches completed in 1688
Churches in Delaware County, Pennsylvania
17th-century Quaker meeting houses
1688 establishments in Pennsylvania